In political anthropology, a theatre state is a political state directed towards the performance of drama and ritual rather than more conventional ends such as warfare and welfare. Power in a theatre state is exercised through spectacle. The term was coined by Clifford Geertz in 1980 in reference to political practice in the nineteenth-century Balinese Negara, but its usage has since expanded. Hunik Kwon and Byung-Ho Chung, for example, argue that contemporary North Korea is a theatre state. In Geertz's original usage, the concept of the theatre state contests the notion that precolonial society can be analysed in the conventional discourse of Oriental despotism.

See also
 Negara: The Theatre State in Nineteenth-Century Bali
 Bread and circuses
 Military parades in North Korea
 Byzantinism
 Divide and rule
 Ritual and music system

References

Anthropology
Ritual
Pejorative terms for forms of government
Political metaphors
Drama
Political anthropology